Love Is Love Is Love is a 2020 American drama film directed by Eleanor Coppola, from a screenplay by Coppola and Karen Leigh Hopkins. It stars an ensemble cast led by Joanne Whalley, Chris Messina, Kathy Baker, Marshall Bell, Maya Kazan, Rosanna Arquette, Polly Draper, Elea Oberon, Valarie Pettiford, Alyson Reed, Cybill Shepherd and Rita Wilson.

The three stories explore love, commitment, and loyalty between couples and friends.

It had its world premiere at the Deauville American Film Festival on September 7, 2020.

Plot
Two for Dinner

On a Saturday night, Joanne and Jack have a virtual dinner date as he is presently working on location in Montana as a producer. The couple have grown daughters and allude to having a long happy marriage.

Jack didn't call the previous night, and he claims he fell asleep watching a DVD. He asks Joanne to join him in Montana, but she fears he wouldn't have time for her like the last time.

Suddenly, Jack's connection cuts out. When he's back, another woman is next to him, presumably from the shoot. She says hello, then excuses herself. At one point, he acts jealous when another man pays a little attention to Joanne. They sign off, as Jack says he's exhausted.

The next day Joanne, after dealing with a worker at their house, spends most of the day traveling to surprise her husband in Montana. Arriving late to where he's staying, as he's letting her in, another woman is sneaking out the back.

Sailing Lesson

Diana and John have been married over 40 years. She has adjusted to retired life well, joining various activities like book club, a gardening group with her peers... while he is stir crazy.

Claiming that Diana's become boring, John threatens to get a girlfriend if she doesn't shape up. So, the couple tries to reignite their honeymoon-phase heat through a spontaneous sailing trip with a boat he's recently acquired.

Arriving at the marina, the boat looks neglected, so they first have to spruce it up, with the help of a young man there. They get a sail raised but there is no wind, so they use the outboard motor. Dropping anchor, they have lunch and talk. Discussing classes they did together, both realise the other had legitimate concerns with the cooking and carpentry classes.

When they cannot get the motor restarted, they flag down a speedboat, and discover they used up the gas in the tiny motor. As they get towed back, we see Diana and John have reconnected.

Late Lunch

Young Caroline recently lost her mother Clare, so gathers together a group of her mother's closest friends for an Irish-style wake/luncheon celebration of life in mourning and remembrance.

Caroline, looking stricken and a bit intimidated by the powerful, accomplished guest list, she feels both guilty and saddened about her and her mother’s last interactions. Clare died in fact in a traffic accident on the way to visit her daughter.

A superficial round of anecdotes, most of which are news to Caroline, and comments eventually evolves into deeper remembrances. There are revelations and confessions, stories of abortion and infidelity and secret pregnancy−Caroline−, and the unexpected mid-meal arrival of a package.

The women celebrate sisterhood in tap shoes, each chooses a scarf to remember Clare by, and one sings a song she wrote “Regrets are like rocks that sink to the bottom”

Cast
 Maya Kazan as Caroline
 Joanne Whalley as Joanne
 Chris Messina as Jack
 Kathy Baker as Diana
 Marshall Bell as John
 Cybill Shepherd as Nancy
 Rita Wilson as Mary Kay
 Rosanna Arquette as Anne
 Polly Draper as Milly
 Alyson Reed as Jackie
 Valarie Pettiford as Wendy
 Elea Oberon as Rose
 Nancy Carlin as Patty

Release
It was scheduled to have its world premiere at the Tribeca Film Festival in April 2020, but the festival was postponed due to the COVID-19 pandemic. The film had its world premiere at the Deauville American Film Festival on September 7, 2020. In February 2021, Blue Fox Entertainment acquired distribution rights to the film.

References

External links
 

Films postponed due to the COVID-19 pandemic
American drama films
American Zoetrope films
2020 films
2020 drama films
Films directed by Eleanor Coppola
2020s English-language films
2020s American films